Gretchen Dow Simpson (born 1939 in Cambridge, MA) is a native New Englander painter. She is the author of over 60 magazine covers for The New Yorker Magazine.

Family and personal life
Born Gretchen Hansell Dow, Simpson is the daughter of Elizabeth Sagendorph Dow and Richard A. Dow, who lived in Dover, Mass. Simpson was educated at the Rhode Island School of Design in Providence, RI, class of 1961. She married John Ramsey Simpson Jr, aka actor John Ramsey, on April 20, 1968. In 2005, Simpson received a Pell Grant. In 2010, she received an honorary doctorate from Bryant University, a private university in Rhode Island. Her two daughters are Megan and Phoebe.

Career
Simpson spent many years living in New York City, and from the 1970s to the 1990s over 50 of her paintings were featured as covers of The New Yorker Magazine. Gretchen Dow Simpson has shown her work at the Virginia Lynch Gallery in RI and the Mary Ryan Gallery in NYC.
Her work is best known for her crisp & close-up views of New England architecture and for attention to details, proportions, and lighting effects. Simpson considers herself a “painter with a photographer’s eye,” and architectural forms have always drawn her. She is also drawn to geometry and scale.
In October 2012 a 1,300-square-foot highway mural, based on one of her paintings, was installed on Interstate 95 in Pawtucket, RI as part of the former Rhode Island Governor Lincoln Chafee's Highway Beautification Project.

Simpson's work is exhibited in New York City, Maine, and Rhode Island, and many of her paintings are in private collections.

References 

20th-century American painters
21st-century American painters
American women painters
20th-century American women artists
21st-century American women artists
1939 births
Living people